Mike Moffat (born 27 July 1982) is a Canadian luger who has competed since 1990. Competing in three Winter Olympics, he earned his best Olympic finish of 7th in 2010 (Vancouver). Other Olympic results include 9th in 2006 (Turin) and 11th in 2002 (Salt Lake).

Moffat's best finish at the FIL World Luge Championships was sixth in the men's doubles event at Calgary in 2001.

References

2002 luge men's doubles results
2006 luge men's doubles results
FIL-Luge profile

External links
 
 
 
 

1982 births
Living people
Canadian male lugers
Olympic lugers of Canada
Lugers at the 2002 Winter Olympics
Lugers at the 2006 Winter Olympics
Lugers at the 2010 Winter Olympics
Lugers from Calgary